Edward John Lock (21 November 1868 – 3 May 1949) was an English cricketer who made two first-class appearances for Somerset between 1891–1893.  He also played three matches for the club which were considered 'second-class' matches, when Somerset had their first-class status removed from 1886–1890.  Although his highest first-class score was 10, made against Lancashire in 1891, he had made 41 the previous season against Glamorgan, in a match not considered first-class.

References

External links
 
 

1868 births
1949 deaths
Somerset cricketers
English cricketers
Sportspeople from Taunton